The Greek Orthodox Church of Saint Mary, also known as the Greek Orthodox Church of the Annunciation of the Mother of God, is located in Tehran, Iran. Inaugurated in 1951, it was founded to serve the once-vibrant Greek community of Tehran, which by the 1960s and 1970s, prior to the Islamic Revolution (1979), numbered 3,000 people. When founded, the church was located at the intersection of the Roosevelt and Takht-e Jamshid streets. These streets were renamed Taleghani and Mofatteh respectively, after the Islamic Revolution.

References

Sources
 

Churches in Tehran
Greek Orthodox churches
1951 establishments in Iran
Greece–Iran relations
Greek Orthodoxy in the Middle East